Radoslav Komitov (born 14 December 1977) is a Bulgarian footballer, and currently manager of Ludogorets Razgrad II.

References

External links

 

1977 births
Living people
Bulgarian footballers
First Professional Football League (Bulgaria) players
FC Lokomotiv Gorna Oryahovitsa players
FC Dunav Ruse players
Rot-Weiß Oberhausen players
PFC Svetkavitsa players
PFC Ludogorets Razgrad players
Association football defenders
People from Veliko Tarnovo
Sportspeople from Veliko Tarnovo Province